CGS Mansoor Ali is a Leader Class offshore patrol vessel of the Bangladesh Coast Guard. She is serving the Bangladesh Coast Guard since 2020.

History
The ship was laid down on 4 April 1985 at Fincantieri and launched at 21 June 1986. She was commissioned to the Italian Navy as an ASW corvette named Urania (F 552) at 1 June 1987. On 10 March 2016, she was decommissioned from the Italian Navy and sold to the Bangladesh Coast Guard. The ship has gone through extensive refit at Fincantieri where it was converted to an offshore patrol vessel. All sensors and armaments were removed from the ship and replaced by the Bangladesh Coast Guard requirements.

Career
The ship was handed over to the Bangladesh Coast Guard on 12 October 2017. She reached the port of Mongla on 21 December 2017. She was commissioned to the Bangladesh Coast Guard on 15 November 2020.

See also
 List of ships of the Bangladesh Coast Guard
 CGS Syed Nazrul
 CGS Tajuddin
 CGS Kamruzzaman

References

Ships of the Bangladesh Coast Guard
1986 ships
Ships built by Fincantieri
Ships built in Italy